Go On may refer to:

 Go On (TV series), a TV series starring Matthew Perry
 Go On..., the third album by American pop band Mr. Mister
 "Go On" (George Strait song), a country music song recorded by George Strait
 "Go On" (Uverworld song)
 Go-on, one of the different readings of Japanese kanji